Shepley Bulfinch (Shepley Bulfinch Richardson & Abbott Inc.) is an international architecture, planning, and interior design firm with offices in Boston, Hartford, Houston, and Phoenix. It is one of the oldest architecture firms in continuous practice in the United States, and was recognized by the American Institute of Architects with its highest honor, the AIA Architecture Firm Award, in 1973.

History
Shepley Bulfinch is the successor firm to the architecture practice formed in Boston in 1874 by American architect Henry Hobson Richardson. Following Richardson's death in 1886, the firm existed as Shepley, Rutan and Coolidge through 1915, then became Coolidge and Shattuck from 1915 through 1924, Coolidge Shepley Bulfinch and Abbott from 1924 through 1952, and Shepley Bulfinch Richardson and Abbott from 1952. In 2009 Shepley Bulfinch acquired Merz Project, a small design studio located in Phoenix, Arizona, that is now the firm's Phoenix office. In 2015, the firm acquired Bailey Architects of Houston as its third office.

The firm today is one of the country's top architecture firms according to Architectural Record and Interior Design magazine, with a client base substantially drawn from healthcare, education, and civic institutions.

Notable Projects

The firm's major projects include the Inner Quadrangle of Stanford University (1891); the Art Institute of Chicago (1893); Harvard Medical School (1906); Harvard University's River Houses (1913–1972); New York Hospital-Cornell Medical School (1934); the campus plan for Northeastern University (1936); the South Quadrangle museums of the Smithsonian (1986); Lafayette College's Farinon College Center (1991); Fordham University's William D. Walsh Library (1996); Smilow Cancer Hospital at Yale-New Haven (2010); and the Harvard Innovation Lab (2011).

The Main South Building (now Berthiaume Family South Building) for Children's Hospital Boston was profiled in the July 2007 issue of Healthcare Design Magazine, and was recipient of Modern Healthcare's 2006 Award of Excellence. Shepley Bulfinch was ranked third among the top architectural firms in the US in terms of the dollar value of new healthcare projects now underway, according to the September 2007 issue of Health Facilities Management. The firm also worked on Sherman Hospital, the largest geothermal hospital project under construction in the world at the time of its completion in 2009. The hospital offers a powerful example of the economic and environmental value of sustainable design.

In 2014, Dartmouth-Hitchcock Medical Center, which was designed by the firm and opened in 1991, was one of two inaugural recipients of the Legacy Project Award by the American College of Healthcare Architects (ACHA) in recognition of the enduring and innovative quality of its original design. In its current work, the firm is designing the City of Austin's new public library, in a joint venture with Lake Flato of San Antonio.

References

External links
 Shepley Bulfinch corporate site

Architecture firms based in Massachusetts
Companies based in Boston
Architects from Boston
Design companies established in 1952
1952 establishments in Massachusetts